The Cure Bowl is an annual American college football bowl game that has been played in December of each year in Orlando, Florida since 2015. It was originally held at Camping World Stadium before moving to Exploria Stadium in 2022. The Cure Bowl is so named to promote awareness and research of breast cancer, with proceeds going to the Breast Cancer Research Foundation. The Cure Bowl usually features teams from the American Athletic Conference and the Sun Belt Conference. Since June 2022, it has been sponsored by Duluth Trading Company, a workwear and accessories company, and is officially known as the Duluth Trading Cure Bowl.

History
The game has tie-ins with the American Athletic Conference (The American) and the Sun Belt Conference. The inaugural game took place on December 19, 2015, featuring the San Jose State Spartans from the Mountain West Conference and the Georgia State Panthers of the Sun Belt Conference. A Mountain West team was invited to the bowl due to The American not having enough bowl-eligible teams to fill the tie-in.

During the planning stages, it was originally proposed to hold the game at Bright House Networks Stadium on the campus of UCF. However, it was later decided to hold the game at the newly renovated Camping World Stadium in downtown Orlando, joining the Camping World Bowl and the Citrus Bowl as annual bowl games at the venue. The bowl remained at Camping World Stadium through 2018, but moved to Exploria Stadium for 2019. In 2020, the game returned to Camping World Stadium.

The game was acquired by ESPN Events in May 2020. The 2020 edition of the bowl, between Liberty and Coastal Carolina, became the first Cure Bowl to go to overtime.

Sponsorship
From its inaugural playing in 2015 through 2018, the game was sponsored by AutoNation and was known as the AutoNation Cure Bowl. In December 2019, FBC Mortgage became the new title sponsor, making the game the FBC Mortgage Cure Bowl. In December 2020, FBC Mortgage renewed its sponsorship of the bowl.  On December 2, 2021, digital marketplace Tailgreeter became the new sponsor of the bowl, making the game the Tailgreeter Cure Bowl. On June 29, 2022, Duluth Trading Company was announced as the new title sponsor for the Duluth Trading Cure Bowl.

Game results
All rankings are taken from the AP Poll prior to the game being played.

Source:

MVPs

Source:

Most appearances
Updated through the December 2022 edition (8 games, 16 total appearances).

Teams with multiple appearances

Teams with a single appearance
Won: Arkansas State, San Jose State, Troy, Tulane

Lost: Georgia Southern, Louisiana, Northern Illinois, UCF, UTSA, Western Kentucky

Appearances by conference
Updated for the December 2022 edition (8 games, 16 total appearances).

Independent appearances: Liberty (2019, 2020)

Game records

Source:

Media coverage

Television
The game was initially televised by CBS Sports Network, making it one of the few bowl games to not be televised by an ESPN network. Following the bowl's acquisition by ESPN Events in 2020, broadcasting moved to ESPN.

Radio

See also
Greater Orlando

References

External links

 
2015 establishments in Florida
American football in Orlando, Florida
Annual sporting events in the United States
College football bowls
Recurring sporting events established in 2015